The 1913 Connaught Cup was the inaugural edition of the Canadian National Challenge Cup, one of the oldest soccer tournaments in Canada and one of the first national championships. It was won by Norwood Wanders of St. Boniface, Manitoba. Current editions of the tournament feature a representative from each provincial association and a final match; in 1913, the competition was played in a four-team league format (under the old system, a win was worth 2 points with a draw worth 1).

Qualified teams
New Ontario (Northern Ontario)/hosts: Fort William C.P.R.
Ontario: Toronto Old Country
Quebec: Lachine (Montreal)
Manitoba: Norwood Wanderers (St. Boniface)

Standings

References

1913
Canadian National Challenge Cup
National Challenge Cup